Jonathan Dee Lemon is an English-born American cartoonist and former musician. He is best known for drawing the Alley Oop comic strip.

Lemon was born in Watford, Hertfordshire, England in 1965, and earned an art degree at the University of Brighton.

In 1984 he formed the pop band Jesus Couldn't Drum with guitarist Peter Pengwyn, and occasionally featuring Lester Square from The Monochrome Set. The band went on to record three albums and had modest indie chart success with their third single "I'm a Train". In 2018, the band's back catalog was acquired by Cherry Red Records.

Two years later, Lemon joined The Chrysanthemums along with Alan Jenkins, leader of The Deep Freeze Mice, and Terry Burrows.  A psychedelic art pop band with a large cult following almost entirely outside of the UK, they released four albums and four EPs. In 2010, German music magazine MusikExpress placed them at number 23 in their list of the most under-rated bands of all time.

Lemon began working as a cartoonist, first for Poot! Comic, and later relocated to California in 1992 where, as a political cartoonist, his work appeared in the San Francisco Chronicle, the San Jose Mercury and the Boston Globe amongst others.  He is a member of the Association of American Editorial Cartoonists and the National Cartoonist Society.

Between 2003-2005 he served as a Peace Corps Volunteer in Honduras.

His long running comic strip Rabbits Against Magic was nominated for a Silver Reuben Award by the National Cartoonists Society in 2012, 2014, and 2021.

In 2019, along with writer Joey Alison Sayers, he took over the drawing duties on the classic comic strip Alley Oop.

His work has been exhibited at the Cartoon Art Museum and the Huntington Beach Arts Center. He has done album artwork for numerous musicians, including Flipper's Guitar, Yukio Yung, and the Thurston Lava Tube. His comic strips are also featured in the 2022 award winning documentary feature film "Jack Has a Plan"

Selected discography
Jesus Couldn't Drum:
Er...Something About Cows (LP, 1984)
Good Morning Mr. Square (LP, 1984)
Ruttling Orange Peel and Blind Lemon Pie (LP, 1985)
The Chrysanthemums:
Mouth Pain/Another Sacred Day (7" 1987)
Is That A Fish On Your Shoulder or are you just pleased to see me? (LP/CD 1987)
The **** Sessions (12" 1988)
Little Flecks Of Foam Around Barking (CD/2x LP 1988)
Picasso's Problem/Live at London Palladium (12" 1990)
Porcupine Quills (LP/CD 1991)
Odessey and Oracle (LP/CD 1992)
Chrysanthemums Go Germany/Insekt Insekt (LP/CD/Box 1995)

References

External links
The Official Jonathan Lemon website
Rabbits Against Magic website
Alley Oop website

Living people
American comic strip cartoonists
American cartoonists
Peace Corps volunteers
Alumni of the University of Brighton
People from Watford
British expatriates in the United States
1965 births
Musicians from Watford